A tetragraph (from the , tetra-, "four" and γράφω, gráphō, "write") is a sequence of four letters used to represent a single sound (phoneme), or a combination of sounds, that do not necessarily correspond to the individual values of the letters. In German, for example, the tetragraph tsch represents the sound of the English digraph ch. English does not have tetragraphs in native words (the closest is perhaps the sequence -ough in words like through), but chth is a true tetragraph when found initially in words of Greek origin such as chthonian.

Phonemes spelled with multiple characters often indicate that either the phoneme or the script is alien to the language. The Romanized Popular Alphabet created for the Hmong languages includes three tetragraphs: nplh, ntsh, and ntxh, which represent complex consonants.

List of tetragraphs

Latin script

Cyrillic script
In Cyrillic used for languages of the Caucasus, there are tetragraphs as doubled digraphs used for 'strong' consonants (typically transcribed in the IPA as geminate), and also labialized homologues of trigraphs. 

 is used in Archi for 

 is used in Archi for 

 is used in Archi for 

 is used in Archi for 

 is used in Archi for 

 is used in Archi for 

 is used in Archi for

Canadian syllabics
Inuktitut syllabics has a series of trigraphs for ŋ followed by a vowel.  For geminate ŋŋ, these are form tetragraphs with n: 
ᙱ ŋŋi, ᙳ ŋŋu, ᙵ ŋŋa
These are literally nnggi, nnggu, nngga.

See also
Digraph (orthography)
Trigraph (orthography)
Pentagraph
Hexagraph
Heptagraph
Multigraph (orthography)
List of Cyrillic letters
Unigraph (orthography)

References

4